Ellen Gilchrist (born February 20, 1935) is an American novelist, short story writer, and poet. She won a National Book Award for her 1984 collection of short stories, Victory Over Japan.

Life

Gilchrist was born in Vicksburg, Mississippi, and  spent part of her childhood on a plantation owned by her maternal grandparents. She earned a Bachelor of Arts degree in philosophy and studied creative writing under renowned writer Eudora Welty at Millsaps College. Later in life, Gilchrist enrolled in the creative writing program at the University of Arkansas, but she never completed her MFA. Gilchrist has been married and divorced four times (two marriages and divorces were with the same man) and has three children, fourteen grandchildren and two great grandchildren. She lives in Fayetteville, Arkansas, and Ocean Springs, Mississippi. She was a professor of creative writing and contemporary fiction at the University of Arkansas.

Criticism

A success for the recently founded University of Arkansas Press, In the Land of Dreamy Dreams (1981) sold more than 10,000 copies in its first ten months and won immense critical acclaim. Victory over Japan, a collection of short stories, won the U.S. National Book Award for Fiction in 1984. Gilchrist has also won awards for her poetry, although it is her short fiction for which she is most well-known. Gilchrist's stories are often praised for the characters that reappear regularly throughout her many volumes of short stories. Her latest book is A Dangerous Age (Algonquin, 2008).

Gilchrist was heard regularly as a commentator on National Public Radio's Morning Edition from 1984 to 1985. Her NPR commentaries have been published in her book Falling Through Space.

Bibliography
Novels
The Annunciation (1983)
The Anna Papers (1988)
Net of Jewels (1992)
Starcarbon: A Meditation on Love (1994)
Anabasis (1994)
Sarah Conley (1997)
A Dangerous Age (2008)

Story collections
In the Land of Dreamy Dreams (1981)
Victory over Japan (1984)
Drunk with Love (1986)
Light Can Be Both Wave and Particle (1989)
I Cannot Get You Close Enough: Three Novellas (1990)
The Age of Miracles (1995)
Rhoda (1995)
The Courts of Love (1996)
Flights of Angels (1998)
The Cabal (2000)
Collected Stories (2000)
I, Rhoda Manning, Go Hunting With My Daddy (2002)
Nora Jane: A Life in Stories (2005)
Acts of God (2014)

Other
The Land Surveyor's Daughter (poetry) (1979)
Riding out the Tropical Depression: Selected Poems, 1975-1985 (1986)
Falling Through Space: The Journals of Ellen Gilchrist (1987)
The Writing Life (2005)

References

External links
The Mississippi Writers Page: Ellen Gilchrist
Encyclopedia of Arkansas History & Culture: Ellen Gilchrist
"A Splendid Irreverence: Ellen Gilchrist" by Jon Parrish Peede from Millsaps Magazine
Oprah's Book Club

1935 births
Living people
20th-century American novelists
21st-century American novelists
American women novelists
American women short story writers
National Book Award winners
Novelists from Mississippi
Writers from Arkansas
University of Arkansas people
People from Fayetteville, Arkansas
20th-century American women writers
21st-century American women writers
20th-century American short story writers
21st-century American short story writers